Kamanjab Airport  is an airport serving the town of Kamanjab in Kunene Region, Namibia.

See also

List of airports in Namibia
Transport in Namibia

References

 Google Earth

External links
OurAirports - Kamanjab
OpenStreetMap - Kamanjab

Airports in Namibia